During the 2008–09 German football season, TSG 1899 Hoffenheim competed in the Bundesliga.

Season summary
In their first ever season in the Bundesliga, Hoffenheim finished seventh.

First-team squad
Squad at end of season

Left club during season

Competitions

Overview

Bundesliga

League table

Results summary

Results by round

Matches

DFB-Pokal

References

Notes

TSG 1899 Hoffenheim seasons
TSG 1899 Hoffenheim